Nokia 105 (2017) is a Nokia-branded mobile phone developed by HMD Global. It was released on 17 July 2017 (alongside the Nokia 130 (2017)) and is available in black, white, and blue. It also has 3 games: Snake Xenzia, Doodle Jump, and Crossy Road. There are some other Nokia 105 units sold in certain regions that also have 3 more games: Ninja Up, Air Strike and Tetris.

The phone comes in both standard and dual-sim editions. It operates on the GSM 900/1800 (EU) and GSM 850/1900 (US) networks. Being a 2G mobile it has been mostly superseded by newer mobile devices that operate on the 3G/4G networks.

External links 
 Nokia 105 (2017)

105 (2017)
Mobile phones introduced in 2017
Mobile phones with user-replaceable battery